

In Greek mythology, Thalia ( or ; ; "the joyous, the flourishing", from , thállein; "to flourish, to be verdant"), also spelled Thaleia, was one of the Muses, the goddess who presided over comedy and idyllic poetry. In this context her name means "flourishing", because the praises in her songs flourish through time.

Appearance 
Thalia was portrayed as a young woman with a joyous air, crowned with ivy, wearing boots and holding a comic mask in her hand. Many of her statues also hold a bugle and a trumpet (both used to support the actors' voices in ancient comedy), or occasionally a shepherd's staff or a wreath of ivy.

Family 
Thalia was the daughter of Zeus and Mnemosyne, the eighth-born of the nine Muses. According to Apollodorus, she and Apollo were the parents of the Corybantes.

Gallery

See also
Muses in popular culture
Thalia (Grace)
Thalia (Nereid)
Thalia (nymph)

Notes

References
 Apollodorus, Apollodorus, The Library, with an English Translation by Sir James George Frazer, F.B.A., F.R.S. in 2 Volumes, Cambridge, Massachusetts, Harvard University Press; London, William Heinemann Ltd., 1921. . Online version at the Perseus Digital Library.
 Grimal, Pierre, The Dictionary of Classical Mythology, Wiley-Blackwell, 1996, . "Thalia" 1. p. 442.
 Smith, William; Dictionary of Greek and Roman Biography and Mythology, London (1873). "Thaleia" 1.

External links
 
 Warburg Institute Iconographic Database (ca 40 images of Thalia)

Greek Muses
Ancient Greek comedy
Children of Zeus
Women of Apollo
Greek goddesses
Ancient Greek theatre
Music and singing goddesses
Wisdom goddesses
Metamorphoses characters

eo:Talio (mitologio)#Talio, la muzo